The Polytechnic University of Bari is a university located in Bari, Italy. It was founded in 1990 and it is organized in 5 Departments.

In 2018, around 10,072 students were enrolled. In 2018, the academic staff amounted to 275 people.

History and structure
The Polytechnic University of Bari was established with Italian law “Legge n. 245” of 7 August 1990. It is the youngest among the Italian polytechnic universities (the other two being Politecnico di Milano and Politecnico di Torino). Even though other Italian universities also incorporate engineering and science faculties, Italian polytechnic universities are focused on technological faculties and subjects.

Following the reform initiated with the Italian law Legge n. 240 of 2010 and successive modifications, the Polytechnic University of Bari has organized its structure prominently based on departments with an aggregation into 5 big departments, most of which divided into branches:
Department of Electric Engineering and Computer Engineering
Department of Mechanical Engineering, Mathematics and Management
Department of Civil Engineering, Environmental Engineering, Construction Engineering and Chemistry
Department of Architecture
Department of Physics (named after Michelangelo Merlin)

The Headquarters
Most of the structures, classrooms, halls and departments are located inside the campus "Ernesto Quagliariello" in Bari. It is shared with the University of Bari (only for scientific subjects), and it is located close to via Orabona. In the nearby via Amendola are the rector's office and the administrative offices for enrollment and similar inquiries. In Bari's Japigia quarter are located most of the offices and laboratories of the Departments of Mechanical Engineering, Mathematics and Management.

The Polytechnic University of Bari is also present in other two separate branches, in Foggia and Taranto (where "Centro Interdipartimentale Magna Grecia" is located).

See also
List of Italian universities
Bari

References

External links
 

Universities in Italy
Bari
Educational institutions established in 1990
Buildings and structures in the Province of Bari
Education in Apulia
1990 establishments in Italy
Architecture schools in Italy